Ganapathi Sachchidananda is a Hindu avadhuta. He is a religious figure mainly in Andhra Pradesh, Karnataka and Tamil Nadu as well as having a large amount of followers in the United States of America and the United Kingdom

Shuka Vana aviary 
Sri Swamiji established Shuka Vana, an aviary and a rehabilitation center for birds. Located on premises of Ashrama in Mysore. The aviary has over 2,100 rare birds of more than 470 endangered and critically endangered exotic species.

A well-equipped hospital is attached to Shuka Vana. The hospital helps injured and ill birds and assists with their rehabilitation.

Organizations founded 
Sri Swamiji has founded a number of organizations including:

Avadhoota Datta Peetham 
Avadhoota Datta Peetham is an umbrella organization supporting Sri Swamiji's vision and mission responsible for providing guidance for all other organizations.

Amma Vodi 
Amma Vodi, meaning Mother's Lap is a 200 bed rehabilitation center and hospital for destitute women in Dundigal, near Hyderabad, India.

Recognitions

Guinness World Records 
Guinness World Records set by Sri Swamiji.
 Most people chanting: a world record of 128,918 people in Tenali, India on 31 January 2015
 Largest Hindu smriti: (body of Hindu texts)  x  on 26 May 2017 
 Largest music therapy lesson: a world record of 1,841 people at the Sydney Opera House conducted by Sri Swamiji on 6 April 2015
 Longest chanting marathon (team): 24 hours, 10 minutes, 8 seconds on 31 July 2015, at Karya Siddhi Hanuman Temple in Frisco, Texas. 
 Largest breathing lesson: July 2016, at India Community Center, Milpitas, California, USA
 Largest online video album of people chanting: 40,976 videos announced at Carapichaima, Trinidad and Tobago 31 July 2016 
 Largest display of bonsai trees: over 2,600 at the World Bonsai Convention in Mysore Ashrama December 2016 
 Most bird species in an aviary: 486 species, 6 May 2017
 World's largest special stamp: measures , on 26 May 2018 at Avadhoota Datta Peetham, Mysuru, India. The stamp was issued by the Indian Postal Department commemorating the Vishwam Museum.

References

External links

 Avadhoota Datta Peetham (Sri Ganapathy Sachchidananda Ashram)

1942 births
Living people
Indian Hindu saints
Musicians from Mysore
20th-century Hindu religious leaders
21st-century Hindu religious leaders